Mike Hezemans (born 25 July 1969, in Eindhoven) is a professional racecar driver from the Netherlands. Mike is the son of Toine Hezemans and brother of Loris Hezemans. Mike started in karting in 1981, and won the Dutch National Championship in 1984. In 1989 he finished 2nd in the European Championship Formula A and 3rd in the World Championship Formula A.

In 1990 Hezemans started racing cars. He entered the Dutch Touring Car Championship, the premier racing series of The Netherlands. He won the fourth race that he competed in and added 2 more victories later that year. in 1991 he moved to the Porsche Supercup and ADAC GT Cup. In 1994 Mike entered the BPR Global GT Series which ran through 1996. In 1997 this series was replaced by the prestigious FIA GT Championship. This series would later become an official FIA World Championship. Mike was the most successful Dutch driver in this series with 14 victories. He finished second in the championship four times, in 2000, 2001, 2008, and 2009. Mike also finished third overall in 2007 driving a Corvette C6.R for Carsport Holland, a team that was largely run by Mike and his father Toine. That same year Mike also won the 24 hours of Spa in the Carsport Corvette. He won this legendary endurance race again in 2009. Outside of GT1 Mike teamed up with Anthony Kumpen to win the 24 hours of Zolder in 2002, 2003 and 2004. Mike holds the record for the most pole positions in GT1, with 12 fastest qualifying laps.

In 1995, while competing in international racing, Mike returned to his first love of karting by opening Hezemans Indoor Karting in Eindhoven, The Netherlands. The dual-level tracks has been a success for decades and was updated to solar powered electric karts in 2018. A year earlier, Mike had opened R1 Indoor Karting in Lincoln, RI, USA, also with exclusively electric karts. The successful venue includes a restaurant and bowling alleys, and was expanded with the Axe Bar (axe throwing) in 2019 plus an arcade and a family entertainment center in 2020.

All during his exploits in racing, Mike has built a successful real estate business with properties in Miami and the Netherlands. He has two daughters, Leva and Fay and lives Miami Beach, FL, USA.

Racing record

24 Hours of Le Mans results

Partial GT World Championship results

References

1969 births
Living people
Dutch racing drivers
FIA GT Championship drivers
24 Hours of Le Mans drivers
Sportspeople from Eindhoven
American Le Mans Series drivers
European Le Mans Series drivers
FIA GT1 World Championship drivers
Porsche Supercup drivers
Blancpain Endurance Series drivers
ADAC GT Masters drivers
24 Hours of Spa drivers

Phoenix Racing drivers